Francis Kajiya (1954 – 28 August 2013) was a Zambian footballer who played as a right winger.

Career
Kajiya played club football for Green Buffaloes and Ndola United, as well as the Zambian national team.

Personal life
Kajiya had 11 children, including fellow player Collins Mbesuma.

References

1954 births
2013 deaths
Zambian footballers
Zambia international footballers
Association football wingers
Green Buffaloes F.C. players